Rəsullu or Rassuli or Rassuly may refer to:
 Rəsullu, Dashkasan, Azerbaijan
 Rəsullu, Imishli, Azerbaijan